Timothy Bernard McKyer (born September 5, 1963) is a former professional American football player. He was selected by the San Francisco 49ers in the third round of the 1986 NFL Draft and played in 12 NFL seasons for 7 different teams from 1986 to 1997.

Biography
McKyer attended Lincoln High School in Port Arthur, Texas, and then the University of Texas at Arlington. A 6'0", 174 lb. cornerback, McKyer is a three-time Super Bowl champion, two victories with the 49ers in 1988 and 1989 and one with the Denver Broncos in 1997. During his rookie season with San Francisco, he intercepted 6 passes for 33 yards and 1 touchdown. He was a second team All-Conference corner for two NFL seasons and was named to the "All-Madden Team".  

McKyer became a journeyman throughout the 1990s, bouncing from team to team. This earned him the nickname "Frequent Flyer McKyer." He ended his NFL career after the 1997 season. He gave up the game-winning touchdown to Tony Martin in the 1994 AFC Championship game while with the Pittsburgh Steelers.  The touchdown allowed the heavy underdog San Diego Chargers to reach Super Bowl XXIX in one of the biggest upsets in AFC Championship history. During the Carolina Panthers' inaugural season, he intercepted a pass and scored on a 96-yard interception return for a touchdown to defeat the Super Bowl champion (and NFC West division rival) San Francisco 49ers.  During Super Bowl XXXII while playing for the Denver Broncos, he recovered a fumble on a kickoff return during the third quarter.

1963 births
Living people
American football cornerbacks
Texas–Arlington Mavericks football players
San Francisco 49ers players
Miami Dolphins players
Atlanta Falcons players
Detroit Lions players
Pittsburgh Steelers players
Players of American football from Orlando, Florida
Carolina Panthers players
Denver Broncos players